Jacqueline Duc (12 April 1922 – 30 November 2012) was a French stage, television and film actress.

Selected filmography
 Patrie (1946)
 The White Night (1948)
 Casimir (1950)
 Three Women (1952)
 Bel Ami (1955)
 Promise at Dawn (1970)
 The Party (1980)

References

Bibliography
 Hayward, Susan. French Costume Drama of the 1950s: Fashioning Politics in Film. Intellect Books, 2010.

External links

1922 births
2012 deaths
French film actresses
French stage actresses
French television actresses
Actresses from Paris